David R. Brown was an American football coach.  He served as the head football coach at Franklin & Marshall College in Lancaster, Pennsylvania.  He held that position for the 1903 season.  His coaching record at Franklin & Marshall was 5–5–1.

Head coaching record

References

Year of birth missing
Year of death missing
Franklin & Marshall Diplomats football coaches